Pain Barzand Rural District is in the Central District of Germi County, Ardabil province, Iran. Prior to its joining the district, it was in Angut District until most of that district formed the new Ungut County. At the census of 2006, the rural district's population was 3,600; there were 3,088 inhabitants in the following census of 2011; and in the most recent census of 2016, the population of the rural district was 2,557. The largest of its 30 villages was Qasem Kandi, with 494 people.

References 

Germi County

Rural Districts of Ardabil Province

Populated places in Ardabil Province

Populated places in Germi County